Chef Brown Sauce is a brown sauce established by the company "Chef" in the middle of the 20th century, after the brown sauce market had receded somewhat due to the lifting of certain ketchup production restrictions, but nonetheless managed to gain a foothold in the market. Although the recipe of Chef Brown Sauce remains a matter of indifference to the public, the ingredients include; Vinegar, Sugar, Apples, Barley Malt Vinegar, Water, Tomatoes, Modified Maize Starch, Oranges, Salt, Spices, and bColour: Caramel (E150D). The sauce is gluten free.

History of brown sauce 
Brown sauce is a dark colored, savoury, tomato based sauce said to be created in the British Empire during the late 1800s as a means to liven up their naturally bland meals. The ingredients include dates, molasses, tamarinds, tomatoes, cloves, and cayenne pepper. Brown sauce was typically paired with bland foods such as potatoes because its natural tendency is to overpower its neighboring tastes. The sauce also usually made its most abundant appearances during the winter months with hearty meals like stew and beef. Brown sauce was especially popular throughout the British empire in the late 19th century but it also had influences in Ireland and other European countries.

About Chef 
The Chef brand was originally established in 1921 with a variety of products from pickles to Barbeque sauce. The founder, Will Woods, began by making vinegar and barbeque sauces throughout Ireland. Irish people began to use Chef sauces in recipes, and this habit it was passed down from generation to generation. At some point, production of the Chef brand products was moved out of Ireland and it wasn't until 2015, after ValeoFood had taken over the brand, that the company was then reestablished in Ireland. During this time, Valeo released a new model of bottle for the Chef brand to celebrate its return to Ireland.

ValeoFood Group 
ValeoFoods is an Irish-based company.

In popular culture 
In the 2003 film Intermission, grocery store employees John and Oscar rob a warehouse of a crate of Chef Brown sauce and spend the rest of the movie trying to finish off all the sauce. They pour it into their tea, make Chef sandwiches, etc.

References

External links 

Brand name condiments
Brown sauces
Irish cuisine
Products introduced in 1921